Little Prairie is an unincorporated community in Ascension Parish, Louisiana, United States.

References

Unincorporated communities in Louisiana
Unincorporated communities in Ascension Parish, Louisiana
Baton Rouge metropolitan area